Aethusa (Greek Aithusa) is a daughter of Poseidon and Alcyone in Greek mythology.

Aethusa may also refer to:

 1064 Aethusa, a minor planet orbiting the Sun
 Aethusa (plant), a genus of annual herbs